Rudolf Tomášek (born 11 August 1937) is a retired pole vaulter who represented Czechoslovakia.

He was born in Karlovy Vary, and represented the clubs RH Praha. He finished eighth at the 1960 Olympic Games, won the silver medal at the 1962 European Championships, finished sixth at the 1964 Olympic Games, and won the silver medal at the 1966 European Indoor Games and finished ninth at the 1967 European Indoor Games. He became Czechoslovak champion in 1961, 1962, 1963, 1964, 1965, 1966, 1967 and 1971, and Czechoslovak indoor champion in 1971.

His personal best jump was 5.03 metres, achieved indoor in 1966.

References

1937 births
Living people
Czechoslovak male pole vaulters
Czech male pole vaulters
Athletes (track and field) at the 1960 Summer Olympics
Athletes (track and field) at the 1964 Summer Olympics
Olympic athletes of Czechoslovakia
Sportspeople from Karlovy Vary
European Athletics Championships medalists
World record holders in masters athletics